Below is a list of governors of the Brazilian state of Ceará.

Living Governors 
So far, the nine living governors of Ceará are, in order of beginning of the first term: Gonzaga Mota, Tasso Jereissati, Ciro Gomes, Chico Aguiar, Lúcio Alcântara, Cid Gomes, Camilo Santana and Izolda Cela.

Links 

VARNHAGEN, Francisco Adolpho de. Historia geral do Brazil (v. 2). E. and H. Laemmert, 1857
:pt:Rita Krommen. Mathias Beck and the Cia. Of the West Indies. Fortaleza: UFC, 1994

Ceará